Nova (Richard Rider) is a character appearing in American comic books published by Marvel Comics. The character appeared historically as the star of his own series, and at other times, as a supporting character in team books such as The New Warriors. He is a member of the intergalactic police force known as the Nova Corps. His helmet grants him access to the Nova Force and superhuman abilities including enhanced strength, flight and resistance to injury.

Publication history
The character was created in 1966 by writer Marv Wolfman in issue #3 of his fanzine Super Adventures. Then known as the Star, he was an alien doctor named Denteen who found a spaceship containing pills which gave him a different superhuman power every five minutes. In issue #6, Wolfman and writer Len Wein reimagined the character, now a prisoner named Kraken Roo who turns out to become the superhero Black Nova. Years later, Wolfman (working for Marvel Comics) and artist John Romita Sr. tweaked the design of the character's uniform and created a new origin story.

Nova debuted in The Man Called Nova #1 (Sept. 1976), written by Wolfman and drawn by John Buscema. Wolfman intended the teenage character to be an homage to Stan Lee and Steve Ditko's Spider-Man, down to his humble working-class roots and alliterative alter-ego. The original series lasted 25 issues from September 1976 to May 1979. Dangling plot lines were resolved in issues #206-214 of Fantastic Four (also by Wolfman) and issue #24 of Rom: Spaceknight. The character then disappeared into obscurity until returning as a member of the original New Warriors team debuting in The Mighty Thor #411 (December 1989), and continuing through The New Warriors #1-75 and Annuals #1-4 (July 1990—September 1996).

Following two subsequent Nova titles, Nova (vol. 2) #1-18 (Jan. 1994-June 1995) and Nova the Human Rocket (vol. 3) #1-7 (May.-Nov. 1999), Nova would return in The New Warriors (vol. 2) #0-10 (Oct. 1999—July 2000) and New Warriors (vol. 3) #1-6 (July 2005-Dec. 2005). After a four-issue miniseries titled Annihilation: Nova and a leading role in Annihilation #1-6, Nova (vol. 4) ran for 36 issues (April 2007-April 2010). This series tied into Annihilation: Conquest, Secret Invasion, and War of Kings. After the cancellation of Nova (vol. 4), some remaining plot threads were addressed in The Thanos Imperative, a six-issue miniseries with two bookend one-shots (May 2010-Feb. 2011).

Nova appeared as a member of the Secret Avengers during the first four issues of that team's eponymous series (May - Aug. 2010).

Nova appears in a Guardians of the Galaxy storyline running from August to October 2014, an Original Sin tie-in featuring a flashback to events immediately following The Thanos Imperative.

Fictional character biography

Original series

When the last surviving member of the planet Xandar's elite Nova Corps, Rhomann Dey, is dying, he selects New York high school student Richard Rider to replace him. Rider is given the uniform and powers of a Nova Centurion, but little instruction on how to use them. Calling himself Nova, Rider becomes a superhero, fighting costumed supervillains such as the Condor, Powerhouse, Diamondhead, the Corruptor, and the Sphinx, and teaming with heroes such as Spider-Man and Thor. He initially hides his identity, but later reveals it to his family.

Rider discovers Dey's spaceship orbiting Earth and uses it to journey to Xandar with Doctor Sun, Powerhouse, Comet, the Crimebuster and the Sphinx, where they join the Xandarians' war against the Skrulls. With the help of Rom the Space Knight, the Skrulls are defeated. Wanting to return to Earth, Rider is released from his duties on Xandar and relinquishes his powers.

The New Warriors
Upon his return to Earth, Rider struggles to readjust due to his failure to complete high school. Unknown to him, the planet Xandar is utterly destroyed in an attack by the space pirate Nebula. With the help of Night Thrasher, Rider regains his powers and joins the New Warriors superhero team, where he becomes close friends with Speedball. Richard briefly dates Yale student Laura Dunham and teammate Namorita.

Rider encounters Garthan Saal, a former Nova Corps Centurion who had been driven insane by absorbing too much of the Nova Force, the source of power for Nova Centurions. Saal seeks more power so he can restore Xandar to its former glory. He strips Rider of his powers and transports him to Xandar. Saal is defeated. Rider witnesses the reformation of the Nova Corps and receives the rank of Centurion Prime.

Assigned to Earth, Rider is confronted with the challenge of balancing dual lives as a member of both the Nova Corps and the New Warriors. Rider encounters a Nova Corps member from an alternate timeline named Nova 0:0, who prepares him to stop the Deathstorm, which is coming to destroy Earth. Because Rider defies Xandar's Queen Adora to stop the Deathstorm, he is temporarily stripped of his powers and rank, but is given back his powers when his replacement sacrifices himself.

Annihilation
Nova briefly travels the U.S. with the reformed New Warriors as part of a reality television show. Rider leaves the group when he is summoned to Xandar alongside the entire Nova Corps, which has been fully mobilized to respond to the Annihilation Wave, a force from the Negative Zone led by Annihilus. The wave decimates Xandar and the corps in a surprise attack. As the only surviving centurion, Rider makes contact with the Xandarian Worldmind, a living supercomputer that regulates the Nova Force and is caretaker of the entire database of Xandarian civilization. The Worldmind uploads itself and the entire Nova Force into Rider, greatly enhancing his abilities. During the Annihilation War, Rider takes command of the United Front, a loose collaboration of soldiers. In a nearly year-long campaign, Rider resists the Wave's advance across the galaxy until the United Front suffers a swift defeat. He leads a small team into the Wave's conquered territory and eventually engages Annihilus in personal combat, killing him.

After the Annihilation War, Rider returns to Earth to rest. However, finding out that his pleas for help in the Annihilation War were ignored by Earth's superheroes because of a Civil War, and meeting Penance - his old friend Speedball, who was mentally scarred by the events leading up to said war - Rider returns to space, feeling out of place on Earth and disturbed by what Penance had become.

Post-Annihilation
Attempting to aid the Kree against an assault from the Phalanx, Rider is wounded and crash-lands on a sparsely populated Kree outpost. While Rider's unconscious body recovers, Worldmind deputizes a local Kree commander, Ko-Rel, to guard him. Rider is infected by the transmode virus and joins the Phalanx. Now tasked with killing Rider before the Worldmind falls into enemy hands, Ko-Rel attacks him, only to be killed by Gamora in retaliation. Upon her death, her fraction of the Nova force returns to Rider and enables him to overcome the transmode virus. He flees Kree space pursued by Gamora and a Phalanx-controlled Drax. Seeking a cure for the transmode virus, Rider eventually arrives on Kvch, home planet of the Technarchy. Rider enlists the help of the mutant Warlock and his son Tyro, who cure Rider, Drax, and Gamora of the transmode virus. The five return to Hala to engage the Phalanx.

When ambushed by Skrulls during the Secret Invasion storyline, Rider is aided by Kl'rt the Super-Skrull. He learns about the Secret Invasion and heads for Earth. Rider learns that Project Pegasus, the base where his brother now works, is under Skrull attack. Working with Darkhawk, Rider successfully stops the Skrulls' advance. The scientists of the facility extract the Worldmind from his brain and use the supercomputer to jump-start a project known as the quantum flask, which restores Quasar to life. A Skrull warship is about to attack Project Pegasus but is destroyed by a band of alien Nova Centurions who then declare their allegiance to Rider.

Rider learns that the Worldmind has been recruiting members for the Corps without telling him. When he learns that Ego the Living Planet is among the new recruits, he becomes enraged and tries to battle Worldmind. As a result, he is stripped of his rank and ejected from the Nova Corps. Because his body has become dependent on the Nova Force, Rider will die if he is without it for too long. As a temporary measure, he borrows the quantum bands from Wendell Vaughn and becomes Quasar. Using his new abilities, Rider rescues the Corps from the War of Kings. Ego is removed as a Centurion and Rider regains his Nova Prime status, but not before most of the new recruits are slaughtered by the Shi'ar Imperial Guard. Nova agrees to train the remaining new Centurions, including his younger brother Robert.

Nova is recruited for the Secret Avengers by Steve Rogers and sent to Mars to investigate Roxxon's operations on that planet. While there, Rider discovers a second Serpent Crown secreted there, only to fall under its influence until rescued by Rogers and his team of Avengers. Shortly after this mission, Nova is called away to deal with the events of The Thanos Imperative and Steve Rogers confirms he has left the team.

Realm of Kings and The Thanos Imperative
A lost Nova Corps ship appears from a tear in space-time known as the Fault. Onboard is Zan Philo, a long-missing Nova Centurion who is assigned to train the new recruits. Later, Rider and Darkhawk find themselves inside the Fault, where they are called to do battle for the Sphinx against his younger self. Because of the unstable timestream inside the Fault, Nova is able to return with Namorita, his old girlfriend who had died a few years earlier. Rider returns to Project Pegasus, where he confronts an alternate Quasar who originates from the Cancerverse, a universe within the Fault.

Catching up to the alternate Quasar, Rider returns to the Fault to see the Universal Church of Truth rip it wide open. Assisted by others, he confronts Lord Mar-Vell, the evil alternate version of Captain Marvel, but cannot stop him.  Entering the Fault to assist the Guardians of the Galaxy, Rider and the Guardians watch Thanos destroy Mar-Vell. Now facing an enraged Thanos, Rider pulls the Nova Force from the rest of the Corps for extra strength. He and Star-Lord are able to hold Thanos back for the few minutes it takes for the Fault to close, trapping all three of them in the Cancerverse. The two heroes continue to fight Thanos for a Cosmic Cube which has the power to send them home. Rider charges the Cube with the Nova Force to create a doorway for Star-Lord, intending to remain behind and keep Thanos from escaping too. Star-Lord escapes, but Rider is unable to prevent Thanos from escaping as well. Because no one is immediately aware Star-Lord survived, Nova and Star-Lord receive a statue in their honor on Hala.

Return
The latest Nova, Sam Alexander, locates the Xandarian Worldmind. Rider's consciousness awakens within the Worldmind during the encounter. It is later revealed that Rider and the Worldmind survived the closure of the Fault and remain trapped in the Cancerverse. Using the Nova Force, Rider manages to escape the Cancerverse, returns to Earth to visit his mother, and learns that his father has died. He encounters Alexander and they begin working together. However, in his escape, Rider has become a portal to the Cancerverse, which repeatedly attempts to invade Earth through him.  Rider returns to the Cancerverse in hopes of closing the portal and thus saving his own universe. Despite his resistance, he is co-opted by the Cancerverse, but is freed by Alexander, who has followed him. The two escape the Cancerverse once more, using the Cosmic Cube carried by Thanos' Cancerverse doppelganger. Rider and Alexander resume their lives and relationships on Earth while continuing as Nova Corpsmen.

In the aftermath of "Empyre," Nova represents the Nova Corps during a Galactic Council meeting held by Kl'rt the Super-Skrull. When Emperor Stote of the Zn'rx was found dead in the restroom and Noh-Varr becomes a suspect after attacking the Skrull subaltern Val-Korr, Nova calls in the Guardians of the Galaxy to investigate Emperor Stote's murder.

During the "Judgment Day" storyline, Nova appears at Port Prometheus to protect the evacuees from the attackers at the time when Uranos the Undying was attacking.

Powers and abilities
Nova derives his powers from an energy source called the Nova Force which all Nova Corps Centurions wield. This energy was transferred to Rider by the Nova Centurion Rhomann Dey. The Nova Force affords Rider superhuman powers including flight, superhuman strength, speed, and durability, as well as the power to absorb energy directed against him and release it as gravimetric pulses and beams, either from specific parts of his body or from his entire body. Nova is a good hand-to-hand combatant, and has been coached by Chord.

Nova wears a standard Xandarian StarCorps uniform, designed to accommodate his powers without being damaged by them. The uniform is highly resistant to damage, including outer space conditions, and is airtight. In addition, the uniform has a built-in life support function that can sustain Rider under the most extreme environmental conditions, including acting as a life-support suit by locking off the mouth and eyes of the helmet. The helmet contains a radio, telescopic sights, night vision sensors, and heat imaging sensors, as well as a visual heads-up display for tracking energy signatures. Nova's helmet has a rigid construction and shape when worn, but becomes as malleable as cloth when it is not, allowing Rider to hide it in his civilian clothes when desired. Nova's uniform is not only extremely malleable, but contains specific functions to aid Rider in his role as a Nova Corps Centurion. Among these features are an electromagnetic discharge that can nullify gravity and an interface to stargates that allow him to enter hyperspace, where he can move at velocities exceeding the speed of light. Rider can also alter the appearance and nature of his uniform to suit his needs. However, as Rider learns the hard way, the Nova Corps keeps a strict dress code. When he makes major cosmetic changes to his uniform after rejoining the New Warriors, Nova is summarily ordered to conform to standard.

During Annihilation, Rider's uniform is altered and enhanced to house the Xandarian Worldmind as well as the entire Nova Force, which was previously used by all members of the Nova Corps. With the Worldmind and the Nova Force, Rider possesses tremendously augmented strength and durability as well as nearly limitless quantities of energy. The Worldmind consists of the entire culture and history of Xandar as well as the individual minds of thousands of years of dead Xandarians. The consensus voice of the Worldmind can speak directly to Rider, helping him to control the Nova Force, fight enemies, sense energy, interface with electronics, and protect against psionic abilities. The Worldmind can also assume direct control of Rider's body when he is asleep.

Marv Wolfman lawsuit
In 1997, on the eve of the impending release of the Blade motion picture, Marv Wolfman sued Marvel Characters Inc. over ownership of all characters he had created for Marvel Comics, including Nova and Blade. A ruling in Marvel's favor was handed down on November 6, 2000. Wolfman's stance was that he had not signed work-for-hire contracts when he created characters including Blade and Nova. In a nonjury trial, the judge ruled that Marvel's later use of the characters was sufficiently different to protect it from Wolfman's claim of copyright ownership.

Reception

Accolades 
 In 2011, IGN ranked Nova 98th in their "Top 100 Comic Book Heroes of All Time" list.
 In 2012, IGN ranked Nova 19th in their "Top 50 Avengers" list.
 In 2017, Den of Geek ranked Nova 2nd in their "Guardians of the Galaxy 3: 50 Marvel Characters We Want to See" list.
 In 2018, CBR.com ranked Nova 1st in their "16 Strongest Nova Corps Members" list, 5th in their "Marvel's Strongest Cosmic Heroes" list, and 15th in their "25 Most Powerful Avengers Ever" list.
 In 2018, CBR.com ranked Nova (Richard Rider) 6th in their "25 Fastest Characters In The Marvel Universe" list.
 In 2022, CBR.com ranked Nova 2nd in their "10 Best Cosmic Heroes in Marvel Comics" list and 11th in their "30 Strongest Marvel Superheroes" list.

Other versions

Earth X
In the alternate future of Earth X, Nova resides in the afterlife. He and two other deceased heroes, Ms. Marvel and Star-Lord, lead an initial charge against Mephisto but are swiftly defeated.

Marvel Zombies
Nova is featured in Marvel Zombies: Dead Days. Unable to overcome his fear and horror of the slaughter occurring around him, Nova fails to act in his own defense when Spider-Man attacks him. Daredevil intervenes, but is bitten when Nova is too shocked to assist. He and Thor are rescued by the Fantastic Four and united with the other surviving heroes on the S.H.I.E.L.D. Helicarrier. Nova panics further when Nick Fury formulates a desperate last stand defense, citing that this was nothing like previous global threats; and that the world was as good as dead. Regardless, Nova helps in the battle until he is bitten by Ms. Marvel. As a zombie, he participates in a failed attack on Doctor Doom's castle, in an effort to get at the humans inside. A zombie version of Nova can be seen in the Marvel Zombies miniseries, being shredded by a hail of metal fragments hurled by Magneto.

He is still mobile, as a zombie, when a swarm of zombies attack and attempt to consume the Silver Surfer. During the incident, Zombie Hulk crushes Zombie Hercules when the latter attempts to steal the Silver Surfer's head. Nova backs away, saying "On second thought, you keep that, big guy". He is later killed by the cosmic zombies.

MC2
Richard Rider appears frequently in the Spider-Girl series, which is set in an alternate future. The MC2 Nova (co-created by Tom DeFalco and Ron Frenz) first appeared in Spider-Girl #7 and wrongly believed Spider-Girl was a supervillain since she was fighting Darkdevil at the time. After a brief battle Nova later realizes his mistake.

Over time, the MC2 Nova attempts to tutor Spider-Girl on the importance of being a superhero. His arrogance and lack of patience with younger heroes causes his lessons to be largely ignored. However, the fact that Nova was a founding member of the New Warriors gave Spider-Girl the inspiration to form a new MC2 version of the Warriors.

By the time of the series, Nova has served as a temporary Avenger. He also appears in the Last Hero Standing and Avengers Next miniseries. Nova also assisted in the battle against Galactus in Last Planet Standing. The Nova in the MC2/Spider-Girl future is eventually confirmed to be Richard Rider in Avengers Next #2. His attitude toward Spider-Girl is often arrogant and dismissive, bordering on the contemptuous; but later he becomes impressed by her, after her surviving a battle against the Avengers' enemy Seth.

Forever Yesterday
Nova appears as the sole Caucasian member of a team of Avengers from a parallel reality where the Middle East is the dominant superpower. He serves the ruler of this alternate Earth, the tyrannical female Sphinx. He is shown the truth of how the female Sphinx used the energy of the Ka Stone to reshape reality by the original Sphinx's former advisor, Sayge. Nova betrays the Sphinx to join Marvel Man (Vance Astrovik) and Firestar of that world's Mutant Liberation Front as well as Night Thrasher, whose parents were murdered in this reality on the orders of the Sphinx. When Nova threatens to murder the Sphinx's cat, she restores reality.

Nova 0:0
The second Nova series Nova deals with Nova 0:0, who is much more adept at using his powers than Richard Rider. He often fights Nova to test him and to push Nova into using his powers in new ways. It is revealed that this Nova is, in fact, the alternate reality version of Richard's younger brother Robert. In that reality, Robert gained the Nova Force powers instead of Richard and stayed behind to lead the Nova Corps and help Xandar rebuild after the war with the Skrulls. Robert's Earth had been destroyed by the Deathstorm while he was off in space. Nova 0:0 would later sacrifice his life preventing the Deathstorm from destroying the 616-version of Earth. He died and was buried on Mars. In the fourth volume of Nova, the Robert Rider of the 616-version of Earth also becomes a member of the Nova Corps (alongside various other humans and non-humans) and again proves capable of using his powers in ways his brother Richard had not.

What If
Issue #15 of What If? contained four stories in which a young widow, a homeless man, Peter Parker, and a criminal became Nova instead of Richard.

In What If? Annihilation, the Annihilation Wave reaches Earth in the climactic battle of the super hero Civil War. Nova, Captain America, and Iron Man work together and sacrifice themselves while using a weapon to destroy the Wave and save Earth.

In other media

Marvel Cinematic Universe
In March 2022, Marvel Studios was revealed to be developing a project featuring Richard Rider / Nova, with Sabir Pirzada writing. It will be a Special Presentation released on Disney+.

Video games
 Richard Rider / Nova appears as a playable character in Marvel Super Hero Squad: The Infinity Gauntlet, voiced by Jason Marsden.
 Richard Rider / Nova appears as a playable character in Ultimate Marvel vs. Capcom 3, voiced by Troy Baker. His Quasar and Kid Nova costumes as well as that of Sam Alexander / Nova from the Ultimate Spider-Man TV series are also available as alternate attires.
 Richard Rider / Nova appears as a playable character in Marvel vs. Capcom: Infinite, voiced by Benjamin Diskin.
 Richard Rider / Nova appears as a non-playable character in Marvel Ultimate Alliance 3: The Black Order, voiced by Robbie Daymond.
 Richard Rider / Nova appears as a playable character in Marvel: Future Fight.

Collected editions

References

Sources

External links

 Nova (Richard Rider) at Marvel.com
 Richard Rider at the Marvel Database Project
 Nova Prime Page (Rich Rider)
 

1976 comics debuts
Avengers (comics) characters
Characters created by John Romita Sr.
Characters created by Marv Wolfman
Comics characters introduced in 1976
Fictional characters from New York (state)
Guardians of the Galaxy characters
Marvel Comics characters who can move at superhuman speeds
Marvel Comics characters with superhuman strength
Marvel Comics titles
Teenage superheroes